Vasiliy Olegovich Kharlamov (born 8 January 1986) is a Russian decathlete.

Achievements

External links 

1986 births
Living people
Russian decathletes
Universiade medalists in athletics (track and field)
Universiade gold medalists for Russia
Medalists at the 2011 Summer Universiade